Cotonou is a city in Benin. Its official population count was 679,012  inhabitants in 2012; however, over two million people live in the larger urban area. 

The urban area continues to expand, notably toward the west. The city lies in the southeast of the country, between the Atlantic Ocean and Lake Nokoué.

In addition to being Benin's largest city, it is the seat of government, although Porto-Novo is the official capital.

History

The name "Cotonou" means "by the river of death" in the Fon language. At the beginning of the 19th century, Cotonou (then spelled "Kutonou") was a small fishing village, and is thought to have been formally founded by King Ghezo of Dahomey in 1830. It grew as a centre for the slave trade, and later palm oil and cotton. In 1851 the French Second Republic made a treaty with King Ghezo that allowed them to establish a trading post at Cotonou. During the reign of King Glele (1858–89), the territory was ceded to the Second French Empire by a treaty signed in 1878. In 1883, the French Navy occupied the city to prevent British conquest of the area. 

After Glele's death in 1889, King Béhanzin unsuccessfully tried to challenge the treaty. The town grew rapidly following the building of the harbour in 1908.

The population in 1960 was only 70,000.

Geography

Cotonou is on the coastal strip between Lake Nokoué and the Atlantic Ocean. The city is cut in two by a canal, the lagoon of Cotonou, dug by the French in 1855. Three bridges are in this area. The Ouémé River flows into the Atlantic Ocean at Cotonou.

The city has established transportation infrastructure including air, sea, river (to Porto Novo), and land routes that facilitate trade with its neighbors Nigeria, Niger, Burkina Faso and Togo.

Coastal erosion has been noted for several decades. It worsened in 1961 following construction of the Nangbeto Dam and deep-water port of Cotonou. A pilot project funded by the United Nations Environment Program (UNEP) revealed that in 40 years, the coast to the east of Cotonou had retreated by 400 meters. This erosion has led many people to leave their homes along the coast.

Climate
Under Köppen's climate classification, Cotonou features a tropical wet and dry climate, alternating with two rainy seasons (April-July and September–October, totalling  of rain per year) and two dry seasons. In December and January, the city is affected by harmattan winds.

Demographics

1979: 320,348 (census count)
1992: 536,827 (census count)
2002: 665,100 (census count)
2013: 679,012 (census count)

French is the official language of Benin. Other languages spoken in Cotonou include Fon, Aja and Yoruba.

Transport

The Autonomous Port of Cotonou is one of the largest in West Africa. The city is connected to Parakou in the north by the Benin-Niger railway. Cotonou International Airport provides service to the capitals of the region and to France, as well as the major cities of Benin: Parakou, Kandi, Natitingou, Djougou, and Savé. There are road connections to neighboring countries: Nigeria, Burkina Faso, Niger, and Togo. A prevalent mode of transport in the city is the motorcycle-taxi, known locally as zémidjan.

In 2015 a suburban passenger railway line was being developed between Cotonou and Pahou.

Economy

Important manufactured goods include palm oil, brewing, textiles, and cement.
Motor vehicles and bicycles are assembled, and there are sawmills in the city. Petroleum products, bauxite, and iron are major exports. There are offshore platforms drilling for oil. The city is a centre for the automotive trade, with European brands being sold from vast open-air parking lots. In the past, Citroën assembled cars (for instance, the Citroën 2CV and Ami 8) locally.

By 2012, piracy in the Gulf of Guinea had significantly decreased trade at the port of Cotonou.

In the  area is a textile  of African prints mainly handled by Indian wholesalers and retailers.

Places of worship    

Among the places of worship, Christian churches are predominant: Roman Catholic Archdiocese of Cotonou (Catholic Church), Protestant Methodist Church in Benin (World Methodist Council), Union of Baptist Churches of Benin (Baptist World Alliance), Living Faith Church Worldwide, Redeemed Christian Church of God, Assemblies of God. There are also Muslim mosques.

Education

The city has a campus of the University of Science and Technology of Benin (Université des sciences et technologies du Bénin) and a campus of the African University of Technology and Management (Université africaine de technologie et de management). Cotonou is a home to African University Institute Foundation (AUi Foundation) one of the biggest educational philanthropic foundations in Africa, It also hosts some of the most prestigious private universities in Africa which includes, African University of Benin(AUB), Ecole Superieure de Gestion de Technologie (ESGT UNIVERSITY BENIN), Ecole Supérieure D’Administration, D’Economie, De Journalisme Et Des Métiers De L’Audiovisuel (ESAE UNIVERSITY BENIN), Institut Superieur de Communication d’Organisation et de Management, Iscom University Benin.

Media
The Office de Radiodiffusion et Télévision du Bénin (ORTB) — the national television and radio operator — is based in Cotonou.

Sister cities and twin towns
   Atlanta, United States
  Salvador da Bahia, Brazil
 Taipei City, Taiwan, since 1967

See also

 Timeline of Cotonou
 Cotonou Agreement
 List of deep water ports
 Railway stations in Benin

References

External links 

 Cotonou Internet Portal

 
Communes of Benin
Populated places in Benin
Port cities in Africa
French West Africa
Populated places established in 1830